Garfield is a comic strip created by Jim Davis and may refer to various aspects and adaptations of the comic:

 Garfield (character), the comic strip's main character

 Film Adaptations:
 Garfield: The Movie, a 2004 live-action/CGI film based on the comic
 Garfield: A Tail of Two Kitties, movie sequel made in 2006
 Garfield (2024 film), a 2024 animated film based on the comic
 Garfield On The Run (2028 film), a 2028 animated film based on the comic

 Video Games:
 Garfield (Atari game), a cancelled side-scrolling platform video game
 Garfield (video game), a 2004 video game based on the comic strip

Aside from the comic, Garfield may also refer to:

Places

Australia 
Garfield, Queensland, a locality in the  Barcaldine Region
Garfield, Victoria

Canada 
Garfield, Alberta
Garfield Range

United States 
Garfield, Arkansas
Freshwater, California, formerly Garfield
Garfield, Colorado
Garfield, Georgia
Garfield, Bonner County, Idaho
Garfield, Jefferson County, Idaho
Garfield, Illinois
Garfield, Indiana
Garfield, Kansas
Garfield, Kentucky
Garfield, Maryland
Garfield, Bay County, Michigan, a settlement in Garfield Township
Garfield, Grand Traverse County, Michigan, a settlement in Garfield Township
Garfield, Missaukee County, Michigan, a former post office in Richland Township
Garfield, Saginaw County, Michigan, a settlement in Swan Creek Township
Garfield, Minnesota
Garfield, Missouri
Mount Garfield (New Hampshire)
Garfield, New Jersey
Garfield, New Mexico
Garfield, Jackson County, Ohio
Garfield, Mahoning County, Ohio
Garfield (Pittsburgh), Pennsylvania
Garfield, Texas
Garfield, Virginia, a former post office and locale in Springfield, Virginia
Garfield, Washington
Garfield, West Virginia
Garfield, Jackson County, Wisconsin, a town
Garfield, Polk County, Wisconsin, a town
Garfield, Portage County, Wisconsin, an unincorporated community

Stations
Garfield railway station, a station in Australia
 Two rapid transit stations on Garfield Avenue in Chicago:
Garfield station (CTA Green Line), a rapid transit station on Garfield Avenue in Chicago
Garfield station (CTA Red Line), a rapid transit station on Garfield Avenue in Chicago
Garfield Avenue station, a light rail station in Jersey City, New Jersey

Other uses
 Garfield (name)
 Garfield (album), 2002 debut album by American singer-songwriter Adam Green
 Garfield (band), a 1970s Canadian progressive rock band
 Garfield Avenue (Los Angeles County)

See also
Garfield County (disambiguation)
Garfield Farm and Inn Museum, a Registered Historic Place in Illinois
Garfield Heights, Ohio
Garfield High School (disambiguation)
Garfield Plantation, Maine
Garfield Township (disambiguation)
James A. Garfield (1831–1881), 20th president of the United States
James Garfield (disambiguation)